Manning is an unincorporated community in Washington County, Oregon, United States on the Sunset Highway (U.S. Route 26/Oregon Route 47). The Banks–Vernonia State Trail, a rail trail conversion, passes through Manning and has a trail head. The NorthWest POINT offers twice-daily roundtrip intercity bus service between Portland and Astoria with a flag stop in Manning.

History
Manning was named for Martin Manning, who took up a land claim there in 1865. Manning post office was established in 1890. In 1954, the community joined with neighboring Buxton and Banks to form the Tri-City Rural Fire Protection District (now Banks Fire District). The Manning school, part of the Banks School District, closed in 1987.

Notable people 

 Hollie Pihl

References

External links
 
 Manning history from VanNatta Forestry

Populated places established in 1890
Unincorporated communities in Washington County, Oregon
1890 establishments in Oregon
Unincorporated communities in Oregon